Abacillodes is a genus of beetles in the family Carabidae, containing the following species:

 Abacillodes jocquei Straneo, 1988
 Abacillodes malawianus Straneo, 1988

References

Pterostichinae